Siti Mariam binti Ismail (Jawi: سيتي مريم اسماعيل ; 20 April 1933 – 1 December 2015), better known by her stage name Mariani, was an early Malaysian-Singaporean Malay actress, singer and model popular during the 1950s and 1960s. She was the older sister of Biduanda Saloma and sister-in-law of P.Ramlee. Mariani was one of the most popular actresses at Jalan Ampas Studios in Singapore at the time, dubbed the "Golden Age of Malay Cinema" at the time. She starred in more than 30 films over her 63-year career span.

Career
Mariam's career began after winning the Singapore Queen Contest in 1951 when she was 17. She was the first lady to ever hold the title. However, she did not represent Singapore at that time. The show has been a stepping stone for her to engage in acting. After that, she was offered an act by Studio Jalan Ampas, but she refused because her ambition was to be a doctor. After two years, it was after being persuaded by Saloma, then Mariani agreed to act. Her first film was Chemburu directed by S. Ramanathan in 1952. After the success of the movie, Mariani was offered another acting in the company's films including Palace of Dreams, A Return, Labu Labi, Nasib Si Labu-Labi and Tiga Abdul. After the closure of Jalan Ampas Studios and the separation of Singapore from Malaysia, she continued her acting career at Studio Merdeka in Kuala Lumpur. She has starred many films in the studio like Sweet Mashed Film and Discouraged. 
In her later years, Mariani continued to act and her latest appearance in films was Pontianak Harum Sundal Malam 2 directed by Shuhaimi Baba in 2005. She also starred in various dramas such as Nur Qalesya, Bila Larut Malam and others more. In 2007, she along with her husband, founded a production company, Kus Semangat Sdn. Bhd., which she owned with her husband, until her death in 2015.

Death
On 1 December 2015, Mariani died after battling with colon cancer, at her home in Taman Kosmo Jaya, Sentul, Kuala Lumpur. She was 82 years old. Her body was sent to Al-Hidayah Mosque in Jalan Sentul and was buried in Jalan Ampang Muslim Cemetery, Kuala Lumpur.

Filmography

Film

Television series

Telemovie

References

External links

1933 births
2015 deaths
Deaths from colorectal cancer
20th-century Malaysian women singers
Malaysian film actresses
Malaysian Muslims
Malaysian people of Malay descent
Singaporean emigrants to Malaysia
20th-century Singaporean women singers
Singaporean film actresses
Singaporean Muslims
Singaporean people of Malay descent